Timothy M. Cullerton is a former Chicago City Council member who represented the 38th Ward on Chicago's Northwest Side. He was appointed by Mayor Richard M. Daley in 2011.

Background
Cullerton's grandfather, William Cullerton, father, Thomas W. Cullerton, and brother-in-law, Thomas Allen, also served as 38th Ward alderman. Cullerton is an electrician who served as chairman of the Chicago Electrical Commission.

Cullerton is a descendant of Edward "Foxy Ed" Cullerton, who was a member of the Chicago City Council first elected in 1871 (when it was still known as the Chicago Common Council), and who served until 1920 (at the time, having been the longest-serving alderman in the city's history, a title he would hold for many years). Edward Cullerton also simultaneously served as an Illinois State Senator, having been elected to that position in 1872.

Until Cullerton's retirement in 2015, for 144 years, a member of the Cullerton family had always sat on the Chicago City Council.

Cullerton's sister, Patti Jo "P.J." Cullerton, served as the 38th Ward Democratic Committeeman for over 20 years. Members of the Cullerton family have been a part of the 38th Ward Regular Democratic Organization as far back as the 1930s.

Cullerton is cousins with Illinois State Senate President John Cullerton, Illinois State Senator Tom Cullerton.

Aldermanic career
In January 2011, Cullerton was appointed by Mayor Richard M. Daley to fill the vacancy left by 38th Ward alderman Thomas R. Allen resigning to become a judge on the Cook County Illinois Circuit Court. He was elected to a full term in a runoff election that April.

Cullerton served on six committees in City Council: Zoning, Landmarks and Building Standards; Housing and Real Estate; Rules and Ethics; Transportation and Public Way; Budget and Government Operations; Aviation.

Cullerton did not seek reelection in 2015. Cullerton had endorsed nonprofit executive Heather Sattler as his preferred successor, however, she lost to redistricted 36th Ward incumbent Nicholas Sposato.

Electoral history

References

External links
38th Ward website

Illinois Democrats
Living people
American electricians
Year of birth missing (living people)
Chicago City Council members appointed by Richard M. Daley